Bill Parry  (1873–1923) was a Welsh international footballer. He was part of the Wales national football team, playing 1 match on 16  March 1895 against Ireland. At club level, he played for Newtown Excelsior.

See also
 List of Wales international footballers (alphabetical)

References

1873 births
1923 deaths
Welsh footballers
Wales international footballers
Place of birth missing
Date of death missing

Association footballers not categorized by position